Map of Love is Taiwanese girl group S.H.E's 1st digital album, and was released on June 22, 2009. In this album, the members of the band will express the theme of love. This album will only be digitally release on Internet music stores. With the exceptions of track 1 and 2, every track was compiled from S.H.E's previous works. "Magic", "Irreplacable", and "Yes I Love You" are from Genesis (2002); "The Smile of Summer" is from Super Star (2003); "I Love You" and "Golden Shield, Iron Cloth" are from Encore (2004); "Oasis" is from Once Upon a Time (2005); "Love's Been Here" is from the soundtrack of the drama Bull Fighting (2008).

Track listing

 鎖住時間 (Lock Up The Time) - 4:12
 可愛萬歲 (Long Live Adorableness)- 3:43
 魔力 (Magic) - 4:42
 無可取代 (Irreplaceable) - 4:50
 我愛你 (I Love You) - 3:51
 綠洲 (Oasis) - 4:30
 Yes I Love You - 4:51
 愛來過 (Love Was Here) - 4:18
 夏天的微笑 (The Smile Of Summer) - 4:50
 金鐘罩鐵布衫 (Golden Shield, Iron Cloth) - 4:05

References

2009 albums
S.H.E albums
HIM International Music albums